Roller skating and inline hockey were contested at the 2003 Pan American Games, held from August 1 to August 17 in Santo Domingo, Dominican Republic.

Roller skating

Men
Speed

Artistic

Women
Speed

Artistic

Inline hockey

Men

Medal table

References
 Roller skating results (Portuguese)
 Roller hockey results (Portuguese)

2003 in sports
2003
Events at the 2003 Pan American Games